The Braakberg is a 645.5 metre high mountain in the Harz in central Germany, in the unincorporated area of Harz in the district of Göttingen in the state of Lower Saxony.

Geography

Location 
The Braakberg lies in the South Harz within the Harz National Park about 2.4 km north of Lonau. To the north it transitions into the ridge known as Auf dem Acker. The Braakberg forms the watershed between the streams of Große Steinau to the west and Kleine Lonau to the east.

Subpeak 
The Kargeskopf and the Franzosenkopf are southern foothills of the Braakberg. In a wider sense the ridge running away to the southwest is also known as the Braakberg, especially its southern foothills west of Lonau which have a 512.1 m high sub-peak of the same name.: 

Crags and rock formations 
In the transition zone from the Braakberg to the Haspelkopf (ca. ), a high point in the southwestern area of the Auf dem Acker ridge, around 500 m north-northwest of the summit lie the crags of the Sophienklippe (max. ca. ; ) and about  700 m northwest is the Spießerklippe (max. ca. ; ).

Vegetation 
The upper slopes of the mountain are covered in spruce, the very lowest with beech trees. It lies entirely within the Harz National Park.

References

Sources 
 Topographische Karte 1:25000, No. 4228 Riefensbeek
 Topographische Karte 1:25000, No. 4328 Bad Lauterberg im Harz

Mountains of Lower Saxony
Mountains of the Harz
Mountains under 1000 metres
Göttingen (district)